The 43rd 2019 Italian Women's Curling Championship was held from November 2, 2018 to April 14, 2019 in two stages: the group stage (round robin) from November 2, 2018 to March 31, 2019 and the playoff stage from April 13 to 14, 2019.

Five teams took part in the championship.

The winners of the championship were the "Dolomiti FONTEL Gaspari" team (skip Diana Gaspari), who beat the "3S Luserna Luca Lovero" team (skip Veronica Zappone) in the final. The bronze medal was won by the "CC Tofane F - Hotel Menardi" team (skip Federica Apollonio).

The championship was held in conjunction with the 2019 Italian Men's Curling Championship.

Competition format
At the first, group stage (Round robin), the teams play among themselves in a four-round round robin system. If two teams had the same number of wins, they were ranked among themselves according to the result of two their matches; if the number of victories for three or more teams is equal, teams were ranked according to the results of the sum of Draw Shot Challenge (DSC, in centimetres; the smaller value, the higher the rank). The four best teams go to the second stage, the playoff, using the Page playoff system (two best teams, following the results of the group round, hold a match for a direct bye to the final (playoffs-1). The 3rd and 4th teams played, with the winners going to the semifinals (playoffs-2). The semifinal was between the loser in the first match and a winner in the second. In the finals, gold was to the winner of the 1 vs. 2 playoff game and the winner of the semifinal. Losers in the semifinals and the playoffs-2 game played for bronze medal.

Teams

Round robin

 teams to playoffs

Playoffs

1 vs. 2
April 13, 10:00 am

3 vs. 4
April 13, 2:30 pm

Semifinal
April 13, 7:30 pm

Bronze medal match
April 14, 9:30 am

Final
April 14, 2:00 pm

Final standings

References

See also
 2019 Italian Men's Curling Championship
 2019 Italian Mixed Curling Championship
 2019 Italian Mixed Doubles Curling Championship
 2019 Italian Junior Curling Championships

Italian Women's Curling Championship
Italian Women's Curling Championship
Italian Women's Curling Championship
Italian Women's Curling Championship
Italian Women's Curling Championship
Curling
Curling
Curling
Curling
Sport in Piedmont